Feuquières—Fressenneville station (French: Gare de Feuquières—Fressenneville) is a former railway station located in the commune of Feuquières-en-Vimeu in the Somme department, France, near the village of Fressenneville. The station was served by TER Hauts-de-France trains from Le Tréport-Mers to Abbeville. It was a free-access unmanned station.

History
The line was placed in service on 4 December 1882. In 2007, an average of 40 passengers a day used the station, an increase of 1.3% over 2002. The station was renovated as part of a programme by the SNCF in 2008. Train services were discontinued in 2018.

See also
List of SNCF stations in Hauts-de-France

References

External links

 Ligne 25 : Le Tréport – Abbeville, Picardie 
 19th-century postcard of the station building with passengers

Railway stations in France opened in 1882
Defunct railway stations in Somme (department)